Timothy Patrick Brennan (born ) is an American attorney and politician who has represented the 29th District in the Pennsylvania House of Representatives as a Democrat since 2023.

Early life and education
Brennan is a graduate of Nativity BVM High School. He graduated from Ursinus College in 2000. He later attended Trinity University in Ireland and Charles University in Prague, Czech Republic. He became certified in law and government from Widener University School of Law in 2003.

Political career
In 2015, Brennan was elected to represent the Second Ward on the Borough Council of Doylestown, Pennsylvania, where he serving from 2016 until December 2022.

In November 2022, Brennan won the election to represent the 29th District in the Pennsylvania House of Representatives, defeating the Republican and Independent candidates.

Electoral history

References

Living people
Democratic Party members of the Pennsylvania House of Representatives
21st-century American politicians
Year of birth missing (living people)